Náxara Club Deportivo is a Spanish football team based in Nájera in the autonomous community of La Rioja. Founded on 19 March 1933, it plays in 2ª RFEF – Group 2.

History 
Náxara CD originated from enthusiasm of the students of the Santa María La Real school between the 1920s and 1930s. The club finished 3rd in the 2018-19 season in the Tercera División, Group 16.

Season to season

1 season in Segunda División RFEF
18 seasons in Tercera División

References

External links
Futbolme team profile  
Estadios de España 

Football clubs in La Rioja (Spain)
Association football clubs established in 1933
1933 establishments in Spain